Beitar Yavne is an Israeli football club based in Yavne. The club currently plays in Liga Bet South B division.

History
The club was founded in 1958 and played its entire history in the lower divisions of Israeli football. Beitar reached Liga Bet, the fourth tier, for the first time in the 1985–86 season. In the 1986–87 season, former Israel international and Hapoel Kfar Saba player, Israel Fogel, played briefly for the club. In 1997, the club folded.

16 years later, the club was refounded and joined Liga Gimel for the 2013–14 season. At the end of the season, they won Liga Gimel Central division and were promoted to Liga Bet.

Honours

League

Cups

References

External links
F.C. Beitar Yavne The Israel Football Association 

Yavne
Yavne
Association football clubs established in 1958
Association football clubs disestablished in 1997
Association football clubs established in 2013
1958 establishments in Israel
1997 disestablishments in Israel
2013 establishments in Israel
Sport in Yavne